Die Antwoord (Afrikaans for "The Answer") is a South African alternative hip hop group formed in Cape Town in 2008.

The group comprises rappers Watkin Tudor "Ninja" Jones and Anri "Yolandi Visser" du Toit, a male/female duo, and producers HITEK5000 and Lil2Hood. Their image revolves around the South African counterculture movement known as zef and has incorporated work by other artists associated with the movement, such as photographer Roger Ballen.

Die Antwoord has had mainstream success worldwide. Their albums and singles have charted in the top 50—if not top 10—in countries in Europe and North America, and also Australia. Their music has been featured on best-selling video games in the Far Cry franchise as well. One of their earliest songs, "Enter the Ninja", did well in Australia and the UK, while later songs like "Pitbull Terrier" and "Ugly Boy" did well in the US. Their 2016 album peaked at a higher chart position in nearly every country than their previous 2014 album.

In recent years, the group has been involved in several controversies related to accusations of child abuse, sexual assault and hate crimes.

Background
Die Antwoord's male vocalist, Watkin Tudor "Ninja" Jones, was part of the South African music scene for many years, fronting acts such as The Original Evergreen, MaxNormal.TV and The Constructus Corporation. Their debut album $O$ relates to their earlier work, specifically Good Morning South Africa. In the album, multiple tracks are sampled from, or are exact copies of songs on Good Morning South Africa, such as the "Rap Rave Megamix" (where the first glimpses of Jones's Ninja character was seen) were later reformed into the "Zef Side" video, featuring a few verses from "Beat Boy". Ninja told Rolling Stone, "Everything I did before Die Antwoord was me experimenting, messing around and trying to find Die Antwoord . . . everything before it was disposable. It was all throwaway."

Die Antwoord observed that journalists and critics, particularly in the United States, frequently ask if their creative output is a joke or a hoax. When asked if he was playing a character, Ninja said, "Ninja is, how can I say, like Superman is to Clark Kent. The only difference is I don't take off this fokken Superman suit." They have described their work as "documentary fiction" and "exaggerated experience" designed for shock value. Ninja told Spin:
People are unconscious, and you have to use your art as a shock machine to wake them up. Some people are too far gone. They'll just keep asking, "Is it real? Is it real?" That's dwanky. That's a word we have in South Africa, "dwanky." It's like lame. "Is it real?" You have to be futuristic and carry on. You gotta be a good guide to help people get away from dull experience.

Die Antwoord is known for their cult following, in particular the unusually prolific creation of fan art by their followers.

Zef

Die Antwoord's musical and visual style incorporates elements of a "zef" culture, described as modern and trashy, appropriating out-of-date, discarded cultural elements. Yo-Landi said, "It's associated with people who soup their cars up and rock gold and shit. Zef is, you're poor but you're fancy. You're poor but you're sexy, you've got style." Their lyrics are performed in Afrikaans and English.

History

2008–2010: Formation and release of debut album $O$, 5 and Ekstra

Die Antwoord formed in 2008. Their name is Afrikaans for "The Answer" Their debut album $O$ was made available as a free download on their official website. A song from the album, "Wie Maak die Jol Vol" features Cape Flats rappers Garlic Brown (aka Knoffel Bruin), Scallywag, Isaac Mutant, and Jaak Paarl. "Wat Pomp?" features South African rapper Jack Parow. He is also featured in "Doos Dronk" along with Fokofpolisiekar. The album cover was shot by photographer Clayton James Cubitt.

In 2009 South African cinematographer Rob Malpage (along with co-director Ninja) shot the video for their single "Enter the Ninja". The song incorporates elements of Smile.dk's song Butterfly, famous for appearing in the Dance Dance Revolution series. The video features Cape Town artist and turntablist Leon Botha. The video received millions of views online nine months later, which featured on a number of high-traffic blog sites, most notably BoingBoing. This forced them to move their website to a US-based hosting provider to handle the traffic.

Following the success of the video, Die Antwoord signed a record deal with Interscope Records. In April 2010, they performed their first international concert at the Coachella Music Festival, in front of 40,000 people. They then toured internationally in support of $O$.

The EP "5" was the first official release by Die Antwoord on a major record label, Cherrytree Records (an imprint of Interscope Records). The EP features some previously released material, as well as one new track and a remix. "Fish Paste" was released as a promotional single. Pitchfork Media made the entire EP available to stream on 12 June 2010.

Later in 2010, an EP titled Ekstra was released.

Shortly after, they joined the 2011 Big Day Out circuit which took them to New Zealand and Australia, sharing back-to-back sold-out sideshows with M.I.A. At the end of 2010, Die Antwoord won the Myspace Best Music Video of 2010 award for their debut video, "Enter the Ninja".

2011–2013: Ten$ion, record label dispute

In November 2011, Die Antwoord left Interscope Records over a dispute concerning their upcoming album and its lead single, "Fok Julle Naaiers". Visser explained that Interscope "kept pushing us to be more generic" in order to make more money: "If you try to make songs that other people like, your band will always be shit. You always gotta do what you like. If it connects, it's a miracle, but it happened with Die Antwoord." Die Antwoord formed their own independent label, Zef Recordz, and released their new album Ten$Ion through it.

The release was in association with the Good Smile Company and Downtown Records, which handled the marketing and distribution for the record worldwide. Ten$Ion included three more singles following "Fok Julle Naaiers": "I Fink U Freeky", "Baby's on Fire", and "Fatty Boom Boom". The singles included on Ten$Ion began to bring Die Antwoord more into the global spotlight as they were invited to perform on American talk shows and featured in an Alexander Wang advertisement. However, the album was met with average to poor reviews by many critics.

Ten$Ion was followed up with a non-album single, "XP€N$IV $H1T", as well as a remix of Mims' song This Is Why I'm Hot, "Diz Iz Why I'm Hot".

2014: Donker Mag and further touring
Following the release of "XP€N$IV $H1T", Die Antwoord set out on a brief tour across Europe from June to July. Soon after they began touring, snippets for a new single called "Cookie Thumper!", which was to be accompanied by a music video, were released. Around the release of their new single, Die Antwoord also announced the title of their third album, Donker Mag, which was released on 3 June 2014.

The video for "Cookie Thumper!" was released on 18 June 2014 on Noisey's YouTube channel. The video has over 37 million views as of February 2019. On 20 May 2014, "Pitbull Terrier", the second music video from Donker Mag, was released on Die Antwoord's YouTube channel. The video has over 49 million views as of December 2019. The third and final single "Ugly Boy" was released on 4 November 2014.

2015–2016: EP release and Mount Ninji and da Nice Time Kid
In February 2015, Die Antwoord announced that they had started work on new material with DJ Muggs of Cypress Hill. On 19 May 2016 the duo released a mixtape titled Suck on This on SoundCloud. The mixtape features productions from DJ Muggs (known on the album as The Black Goat) and God (formerly known as DJ Hi-Tek, the producer of the group). The track list includes the previously released "Dazed and Confused" and "Bum Bum" as well as "Gucci Coochie," a collaboration with Dita Von Teese. A teaser for the song's video was released on 18 May 2016. However, the music video was never released as of February 2019, and is presumed to be scrapped.

The mixtape also includes remixes for some of the group's previous songs including "I Fink You Freeky," "Fok Julle Naaiers," and "Pitbull Terrier." On 22 July 2016, it was announced that the album would be titled Mount Ninji and da Nice Time Kid, originally called "We Have Candy". The album was released on 16 September 2016.

The first video from the album, "Banana Brain", was released on 31 August 2016. It has accumulated over 21 million views as of January 2017. The second video from the album, "Fat Faded Fuck Face", was released on Vimeo rather than on YouTube, due to its adult content, on 16 December 2016. The video has over 1.2 million views as of January 2018.

2017–present: House of Zef
In early 2017, Die Antwoord announced via social media networks that they are to release their final album, titled The Book of Zef, in September 2017 and disband immediately after. Later the band revealed that the name was changed to "27". The first single, "Love Drug", was released on 5 May 2017. A second single "2•GOLDEN DAWN•7" was released on 22 June 2018.

On 3 May 2019, Die Antwoord released the single "DntTakeMe4aPoes." The song features South African rapper G Boy. A second video published on the same day revealed that the title of the upcoming album would be House of Zef, and that it would feature several amateur guest rappers from South Africa.

A US tour was announced for late 2019. However, an unlisted video on Die Antwoord's channel revealed it was postponed to 2020 to finish the album as well as other projects.

The second single, "Baita Jou Sabela" was released on 30 November 2019, featuring South African rapper Slagysta.

House of Zef was released on 16 March 2020, without any previous announcement by the band.

Other ventures
In an interview with Exclaim! magazine in 2010, the group revealed they have a five album plan. According to Ninja, "We'll be dropping films between each of the albums, feature films... We have one we're working on for next year called The Answer. It's like the story of how Die Antwoord started. But that's like, our power, and where our energy is at right now." They have filmed a short film with American filmmaker Harmony Korine. The short film premiered at SXSW as Umshini Wam (in reference to the Zulu struggle song "Umshini wami") and features "furry costumes, wheelchairs, a music video breakdown, and plenty of zef slang." The film is available online.

In 2012, they did a campaign for Alexander Wang's T range.

In 2014, it was revealed that Die Antwoord would appear in the Neill Blomkamp film Chappie. In an interview, Ninja states that "Neill is, like, our favorite director, so when he asked us to be in Chappie, it was like a complete freak-out". In the film, Die Antwoord star as two gangsters (also named Ninja and Yolandi) who act like the parents of Chappie, a sentient robot, and teach him how to be a gangster. The film was released on 4 March 2015.

In 2019, Die Antwoord started releasing an online reality web series called ZEF TV. There are currently 8 episodes which make up the first season. Later that year, it was revealed that they would be releasing a documentary called "IS IT REAL?" that had been in the works for 10 years, as well as a feature film called "THE FLOWER FROM THE OUTSIDE WORLD."

Artistry
In a teaser video for the Ten$ion album, a character that resembles Jane Alexander's the Butcher Boys was featured. Due to a copyright claim, the video was removed.

Anton Kannemeyer's Black Gynecologist was inspiration for the "Fatty Boom Boom" music video scene, in which a Parktown prawn is removed from Lady Gaga.

In popular culture

Several of Die Antwoord's songs have been featured in the open-world action video games Far Cry 3 and Far Cry New Dawn, "I Fink U Freeky", "Fatty Boom Boom", "Cookie Thumper" and "Shit Just Got Real".

Controversies

Sexual assault allegations 
On 18 March 2019, Australian musician Zheani Sparkes released a diss track titled "The Question" accusing Jones of sexually assaulting her in South Africa in 2013. According to Sparkes, Jones drugged her and trafficked her to Africa, as well as sending explicit photos of her to cast members of Chappie. She also said he was interested in her because of her resemblance to his daughter Sixteen, who was 8 years old at the time of the alleged assault. Text messages shown in the music video for the track allegedly show Jones attempting to engage in incest fantasies with Sparkes. Sparkes later clarified during an interview that her labeling of Jones as a pedophile was more pejorative than a serious accusation. 

A conflict between Die Antwoord and Sparkes ensued on social media afterwards, where Jones accused Sparkes of catfishing him. In September 2019, Sparkes filed a police report in Queensland, Australia formalizing her accusations of sexual assault and revenge porn.

American singer Dionna Dal Monte also accused Jones of sexual assault. Dal Monte asserts the assault occurred at a Die Antwoord show in Padova in 2014.

Jones has denied all the allegations against him.

In a June 2022 interview, American rapper Danny Brown alleged that Jones sat on his lap and forcibly kissed him on the neck at an afterparty in Paris, France.

Fight against Andy Butler 
In 2019, a video from 2012 surfaced, showing Jones and du Toit fighting Hercules and Love Affair founder Andy Butler, who is gay, and calling him homophobic slurs such as "faggot". After fighting him, du Toit and Jones alert security staff, and, while crying, du Toit claims she was sexually assaulted in a bathroom by Butler. Later on in the video, Jones tells du Toit that her performance was "Oscar-winning".

Jones responded on Facebook, claiming that the former photographer and videographer for the group, Ben Jay Crossman, who filmed the video, edited it to make it seem like he and du Toit were in the wrong. He claimed that Butler harassed them in the days leading up to the fight. Jones also claimed that he told du Toit to act as "dramatic as possible" about what Butler did to avoid getting detained by security after the fight.

In the wake of the incident, Die Antwoord were dropped from the lineups of several festivals.

Allegations of child abuse 
In April 2022, Gabriel "Tokkie" du Preez alleged that Jones and du Toit had emotionally, physically and sexually abused him, as well as other minors. In 2010, Jones and du Toit first met du Preez, then age nine, at his school in Vrededorp. In 2013, his mother entered into a foster arrangement with Jones and du Toit, and in the subsequent years du Preez appeared as an actor in various live shows and videos.

Die Antwoord's agent Scumeck Sabottka, of MCT-Agentur in Berlin, released a statement denying the allegations, saying "Die Antwoord don't agree with Tokkie's statements."

Chappie 
City Press / News24 reported that six of the cast and crew of Neill Blomkamp's 2015 Hollywood film, Chappie, confirmed under condition of anonymity that first-time actor Watkin Jones "made life on set hell during filming".

Discography

Studio albums

EPs

Mixtapes

Singles

Remixes

Other appearances

Music videos

Members 
 Ninja (2008–present)
 Yolandi Visser (2008–present)
 HITEK5000 (formerly known as DJ Hi-Tek and God) (2008–present)
Lil2Hood (2019–present)

Collaborators 
Roger Ballen is a frequent collaborator of Die Antwoord, who claim their artwork is heavily inspired by his photography. Ballen helped design the set for their music video "Enter the Ninja". Ballen co-directed the I Fink You Freeky music video. The Erdmann Contemporary Photographers Gallery in Cape Town featured some works of Ballen from the video.

Bitter Comix's creator Anton Kannemeyer released some work featuring Die Antwoord in 2011. He described the song "Doos Dronk" with the words "if ever there were a song that sounded like Bitter Comix, this is it."

$O$ 

 Wat Pomp? – features Jack Parow
 Enter the Ninja – music video features a cameo from former disc jockey Leon Botha
 Wie Maak die Jol Vol – features Knoffel Bruin (Garlic Brown), Isaac Mutant, Jaak Paarl and Scallywag
 My Best Friend – features The Flying Dutchman
 Doos Dronk – features Jack Parow and Fokofpolisiekar
 Orinoco Ninja Flow – remix of Orinoco Flow, arranged by Wedding DJ

Ten$ion 

 Fatty Boom Boom  Die Antwoord turned down an offer by Lady Gaga to perform the opening act for her South African "Born This Way" tour. The music video is meant to be a parody of her. It shows a male drag queen lookalike roaming through the streets after experiencing a carjacking, going to a gynecologist who finds a parktown prawn while examining her, and ending by her getting brutally killed by a lion.

Donker Mag 

 Ugly Boy – In 2014, the group sampled Aphex Twin's "Ageispolis" for their "Ugly Boy" single. In the music video, a man wearing a mask resembling Aphex Twin in blackface can be seen with a hoodie that reads "Hello, My Name Is God" and his symbol can also be seen on a hoodie worn by Yolandi Visser in certain shots. Aphex Twin and Die Antwoord also performed together at London Electric Dance Festival in 2010. The music video features cameos from Cara Delevingne, Charlotte Free, Marilyn Manson, Dita Von Teese, Jack Black, Flea, and the ATL Twins.
 Rat Trap 666 – produced by DJ Muggs

Mount Ninji and da Nice Time Kid 

 Shit Just Got Real – features Sen Dog
 Gucci Coochie – features Dita Von Teese
 Rats Rule – features Jack Black
 Certain tracks were also produced by DJ Muggs

House of Zef 
House of Zef features several South African rappers, who were included to bring a spotlight onto them.

 DntTakeMe4APoes – features G-BOY
 Baita Jou Sabela – features Slagysta

Former touring members 
 Vuilgeboost (Cameryn Clarke) – DJ (2010)

See also 
 Little Big
 Leon Botha

References

Further reading
Claire Scott (2012): "Die Antwoord and a delegitimised South African whiteness: a potential counter-narrative?" 26:5, 745-761

External links

Watkykjy Website which covers Die Antwoord and related culture.

Analysis of the $O$ album from South African magazine Mahala
Roger Ballen/Die Antwoord exhibition

 
Alternative hip hop groups
South African hip hop groups
South African electronic music groups
Cape Town culture
Musical groups established in 2008
Musical quartets
Interscope Records artists